Antuzede is a former civil parish in the municipality of Coimbra, Portugal. The population in 2011 was 2,276, in an area of 9.12 km2. On 28 January 2013 it merged with Vil de Matos to form Antuzede e Vil de Matos.

References 

Former parishes of Coimbra